The Cry of the Wolf is a novel for children or young adults, written by Melvin Burgess and published by Andersen Press in 1990. Set on the island of Great Britain, it features a grey wolf raised partly by humans after learning only a little from its mother before her death, and the hunter who killed her and is obsessed with personally eliminating the species from the wild.

The Cry of the Wolf was Burgess's first novel. He was a highly commended runner up for the annual Carnegie Medal from the Library Association, recognising the year's best children's book by a British subject.

Tambourine Books published the first United States edition in 1992. Translations have been published in Danish, Dutch, Norwegian, French, Spanish, Lithuanian and Slovenian languages, at least.

Plot summary
 Tagline:
 Always before, he had been the Hunter. Now he had been the prey and he had survived. He would live. He would kill again.

The book tells the story of a man who tries to kill the last wild wolves in England, and the wolf, raised among humans, who will try to strike back.
What if there were still wolves in England and only a few people knew it? What if one of those people was an obsessive, half-mad, extremely able hunter who was determined to have the honour of killing the last wolf in England? We are with the last wolf cubs as they are born short minutes before the slaughter begins. The female, called Silver, survives, wounded by The Hunter, only long enough to teach her sole surviving cub a few skills before she too is killed by the man. The cub, Greycub, is reared by Ben and his family and, being a social animal, waits in vain for the sound or scent of a remaining wolf. This is not to be for he is the last wolf in England. Regretfully leaving his human friends, he roams for years searching for a sign of his species, although that is unsuccessful. But what he does find is the Hunter. Greycub tries to kill the Hunter and finally gets to be in the position of the hunter and kills The Hunter.

Analysis

This is a raw and brutal book and, to be sure, a cautionary tale about extinction. However, the focus is on obsession verging on madness. Ben, the boy who rears Greycub, becomes an innocent betrayer of the wolves for it is he who first alerts The Hunter to the presence of the wolf pack. The book reads like non-fiction with an almost detached manner but the brutality is so compelling that detachment on the part of the reader is nearly impossible. In fact, the feelings of readers would make for a fascinating discussion. At which point did they become engaged? Did they ever feel any sympathy for The Hunter? How did the author do that? Also, there is some anthropomorphism present. Could Burgess have done the book without it?

Characters

Animals

Greycub – Son of Silver and Conna. The protagonist of the story, he grows up to live alone in Scotland where he kills his enemy, the Hunter.

Silver – Greycub's mother. Her original mate was killed by the Hunter, she then mated with Conna. She is described as being cunning and intelligent.

Conna – Father to Greycub, second mate to Silver. He is a skilled hunter, killed just before Silver.

Jenny – The Hunter's trustful hunting dog, she had an accident with a hyena, making one of her front legs smaller than the other. Killed by the Hunter for betraying him.

Goldface – Silver's original mate, the first kill of the Hunter.

Cacoo – Conna's cousin. Killed by the hunter.

Brindles – An old wolf in Silver's pack. Killed by the Hunter.

Clapper – A farm dog. Killed by the Hunter when he kidnaps Greycub.

Bell – Farm dog. Killed by the Hunter while keeping watch with Clapper.

Humans

Ben Tilley – A nice boy who tries to help Greycub for most of his life after letting slip to the hunter that there are still wild wolves in England.

The Hunter – The main antagonist of the story, he is driven into a madness to kill the last wolves. He is killed by Greycub.

John Tilley – Ben's father and farmer at High Pond Farm.

Margaret Tilley – Ben's mother. She is somewhat of a clean person but cares for the wolves and her family.

The Breeder – The one who weans Greycub and the only one, besides Ben, that Greycub really respected. He kept over forty deerhounds in his kennels.

See also

Notes

References

External links
 —immediately, first edition  
  —immediately, first US edition 
 

British children's novels
Novels by Melvin Burgess
Novels set in the United Kingdom
1990 British novels
Children's novels about animals
Novels about wolves
Fictional wolves
1990 children's books
Andersen Press books